TCDD DE20000 were the first diesel-electric locomotive built for operations on Turkish State Railways. Five General Electric U18C units with Cooper Bessemer engines were built in 1957–58. All the locomotives are now retired from service.

External links
 Trains of Turkey page on DE20000

General Electric locomotives
Co-Co locomotives
Turkish State Railways diesel locomotives
Standard gauge locomotives of Turkey
Railway locomotives introduced in 1957